This is a list of fictional aircraft, including fixed-wing aircraft, rotary wing aircraft, and lighter-than-air craft. The aircraft in this list are generally intended to operate in an atmosphere, though a few have been stated as being capable of exoatmospheric or sub-orbital flight as well.

These aircraft appear in notable works of fiction, including novels, stories, films, TV series, animation, video games, comics, and other works. They are either the subject of the work or an important element.

Fighters

 ACG-01 Chimera: A prototype aircraft with exceptional maneuverability and responsiveness, it can be equipped with the RDBM (Remote Detonation Burst Missile) and the EUFB (Experimental Uranium Freefall Bomb). From Project Wingman (2020).
 Advanced Dominance Fighter: A family of supermaneuverable air superiority superfighters developed by Gründer Industries in the Ace Combat series of video games.
 ADFX-01/02 Morgan: A family of experimental fighters capable of carrying a chemical laser system and airburst missiles, first featured in Zero: The Belkan War (2006).
 ADF-01 FALKEN: a superfighter armed with an internal laser system, the ability to jam and disrupt HUDs, and backwards-fire capabilities, first featured in 2 (1997).
 ADF-11F Raven: a modular superfighter that can optionally use a UCAV module in place of a manned cockpit, from 7: Skies Unknown (2019). This UCAV can detach and transform to fly on its own as the ADF-11. Unlike preceding ADF aircraft, the ADF-11F lacks forward-swept wings and rearward vertical stabilizers.
 Angel Interceptor: a carrier-based fighter jet from the 1967 TV series Captain Scarlet and the Mysterons. The aircraft operates from an airborne aircraft carrier named Cloudbase. The craft is based on the World Air Force Viper, powered by twin turbo-jet compressors feeding a single ramjet. It is armed with a nose cannon and rockets.
 ASF-X Shinden II: an experimental multirole fighter jet that features forward-swept wings, a two-tiered engine configuration (akin to that of the English Electric Lightning), and variable-geometry wing tips and vertical stabilizers. It was designed by Macross creator Shōji Kawamori for Ace Combat: Assault Horizon (2011).
 AV-14 Attack VTOL: a UNSC airborne attack vehicle, also known as the Hornet, from the Halo video game series.
 A/V-32 Pegasus: a fictional jump jet operated by the US Marine Corps in the Jim DeFelice novel Havana Strike.
 Cobra Rattler: a VTOL attack plane based on the Fairchild Republic A-10 Thunderbolt II. It made its first appearance in G.I. Joe: A Real American Hero in 1984.
 CFA-44 Nosferatu: an advanced carrier-based fighter jet with all-directional multi-purpose missiles (ADMMs), internal jamming pods, and dual railguns, from Ace Combat 6: Fires of Liberation (2007).
CS7 Thunderhawk: a single-engine fighter from Just Cause 3 armed with homing missiles and a machine gun for strafing, which also features partially-folding wings. Used both by the in-universe Medici Military and the opposing rebellion against the military's commander, Sebastiano Di Ravello.
Darkstar: a prototype hypersonic jet based on the SR-72, capable of reaching speeds over Mach 10. Test-flown by the title character in Top Gun: Maverick.
 Eurofighter Hailstorm: a main support fighter equipped with a laser cannon, used by the European Union Enforcer Corps in EndWar.
 F-11X Apollo: a VTOL-equipped single-seater fighter jet equipped with autocannons used by the Allies in Command & Conquer: Red Alert 3 (2008).
 F-19 Ghostrider: based on the Have Blue project of the 1970s. The Testors Model Company released a conceptual model airplane in 1986, and Monogram followed with its own version in 1987. Earning massive media attention, the design became the shape of the mysterious "Stealth Fighter" in the public eye until the F-117 Nighthawk was unveiled in 1990. As it turned out, the sleek and low-profile design looked nothing like the highly angular, faceted F-117 it was meant to portray. The aircraft was described as the F-19A Ghostrider in the Tom Clancy novel Red Storm Rising. The book described the aircraft as being nicknamed the "Frisbee" and having no corners, high-bypass turbofans, and appearing to mimic the shape of a cathedral bell when viewed from above.
 F-41 Broadsword: a UNSC exoatmospheric multirole strike fighter. It is capable of operating within an atmosphere or in a vacuum; the F-41E variant features energy shielding, as seen in Halo 4. This craft comes from the Halo video game series.
 F-22V Velociraptor: a delta wing version of the F-22 Raptor featured in the Jim DeFelice novel Cyclops One.
 F-302 Fighter-Interceptor: An exoatmospheric combat craft developed, and initially fielded by, the Stargate franchise's depiction of the United States of America. Developed as a response to the imminent threat posed by the Milky Way galaxy's dominant power, the Goa'uld System Lords, it was described as having made use of various alien-derived technologies that had been procured through the series' eponymous Stargate Program. Among the various alien-based materials and subsystems said to have been incorporated into the aircraft were its inertial dampening systems, a ‘Naquadah’-based airframe composite, and even a short-range ‘hyperspace-window generator’ granting it limited superluminal propulsion. 
 F/A-37 Talon: a single-seat fighter attack aircraft of the U.S. Navy, which appeared in the 2005 film Stealth. It is capable of Mach 3.5 and supercruise, and has a range of 4,000 miles. It is also accompanied by an AI-operated UAV, which assists in targeting and ISR for the Talon.
 F/A-40 Stalker: a stealth fighter used by the Western Coalition from Frontlines: Fuel of War. It is based on the F-22 Raptor.
 F/A-181 Black Wasp II: A carrier-based multirole fighter aircraft used by NATO in ARMA 3. It is a combination of the F/A-18E Super Hornet and the F-22 Raptor.
 Firehawk: a VTOL multi-role fighter jet that appears in Command & Conquer 3. The craft is a two-seat, forward-swept wing design with rearwards-swept winglets and canards. It can be outfitted with special boosters that enable it to go sub-orbital, allowing it to bypass anti-aircraft fire.
 GAF-1 Varcolac: an advanced fighter jet that features extreme maneuverability and a machine gun on the tail for defense against missiles. It was developed by the Golden Axe Plan from Ace Combat: Joint Assault. Its name is Romanian for "werewolf".
 Gilbert XF-120: a fictitious X-plane portrayed by an XB-51 in camouflage, from the 1956 film Toward the Unknown.
 Manta Fighter: a single-place 1939 twin-prop design, with a delta tail & straight wings near the aft, from the 2004 film Sky Captain and the World of Tomorrow.
 Mikoyan CF-121 Redhawk: an April Fools' prank detailing the RCAF purchase of 30 MiG-21s for Squadron 441 in 1960.
 MiG-28: a fictional aircraft flown by the antagonists in the 1986 film Top Gun. The real aircraft used to portray the MiG-28 was a Northrop F-5.

 MiG-31 Firefox: a fictional aircraft that appeared in Craig Thomas' novels Firefox and Firefox Down, as well as the 1982 film by the same name starring Clint Eastwood. The aircraft was portrayed as a Soviet interceptor with stealth capabilities, and had a thought-controlled weapons system. Its designation is shared with the real MiG-31 Foxhound.
 MiG-37 Ferret: a fictional Soviet stealth model aircraft, produced by Testors as a counter to the American F-19. The craft combined a faceted airframe design with cooled exhausts and radar-absorbing skin. Purely conjectural, the design nonetheless turned out to be closer in shape to the actual F-117 Nighthawk.
 MiG-242: a fictional Soviet aircraft appearing in the 1968 pilot episode of Joe 90, a British Supermarionation television series co-created by Gerry and Sylvia Anderson<ref>Bentley, Chris (2017). Hearn, Marcus (ed.). ;;Captain Scarlet and the Mysterons: The Vault. Cambridge, UK: Signum Books/Flashpoint Media. .</ref>
 Night Raven SP3: an advanced air superiority fighter used by Cobra in the G.I. Joe comics and animated series in the 1980s. It closely resembles the SR-71 Blackbird.
P-996 LAZER: a fictional fighter jet appearing in Grand Theft Auto V, where it can be found in and around Fort Zancudo. Based primarily on the General Dynamics F-16 Fighting Falcon.
Project Wingman Mark I (PW-Mk.I): an experimental fighter aircraft powered by cordium (an unstable material from the game's universe, used as extremely potent fuel and powerful explosives). The titular aircraft of Project Wingman (2020).
X-PF: A prototype aircraft of similar configuration, albeit with an opaque canopy.
 QFA-44: a UCAV variant of the CFA-44 remotely operated by the "Butterfly Master", from Ace Combat Infinity (2014).
 Savoia S.21: a fictional fighter seaplane that appears in the anime film Porco Rosso, directed by Hayao Miyazaki. Its name is shared with the real-life Savoia S.21; however, the two do not look similar.
SP-34R (Icarus Experimental Ballistic Airframe "Spear"): a prototype test platform equipped only with cannons and railguns that lacks a fly-by-wire system. From Project Wingman (2020).
 Su-38 Slamhound: a Russian Spetsnaz Guard Brigade support fighter in EndWar. To-201 Shikra: A multirole/air superiority fighter used by the CSAT in ARMA 3. It is a combination of the Sukhoi Su-57 and the Sukhoi Su-35S.
 VF-0 Phoenix: A series of "variable fighters" from the Macross Zero sci-fi anime series, which can transform into mecha.
 Vic Viper: the protagonist jet fighter in the video game Gradius.
 X-02 Wyvern: An advanced fighter aircraft developed by the fictional nation of Erusea, with 3D thrust vectoring nozzles and variable-geometry tail fins and wings that can switch between a forward- and backward-swept configuration. First featured in Ace Combat 04: Shattered Skies.
 A two-seat variant known as the X-02S Strike Wyvern appears in Ace Combat 7: Skies Unknown.
 X-49 Night Raven: An advanced experimental fighter aircraft with a closed flying wing design. It is equipped with a laser cannon, and requires its pilot to undergo artificial nerve surgery in order to operate it. First featured in Ace Combat 3: Electrosphere.
 XA-20 Razorback: a main support fighter in the United States Joint Strike Force in EndWar. Also appears in H.A.W.X as a reward for completing the game, revealing it to have stealth capabilities.
 XFA-24A Apalis: an experimental multirole fighter developed in the 2010s, first featured in Ace Combat X: Skies of Deception (2006).
 XFA-27: a multirole fighter aircraft with variable geometry wings, boasting high maneuverability and the ability to fire off four missiles simultaneously (being the first aircraft in an Ace Combat game to do so). First featured in Ace Combat 2 (1997).
 XFA-33 Fenrir: a multirole aircraft possessing a massive airframe and equipped with optical camouflage, a microwave radiation gun, VTOL capabilities, thrust-vectoring engines, wingtips, delta wing configuration, canards and V-tail. First featured in Ace Combat X: Skies of Deception (2006)
 XP-14F Skystriker: the primary air-superiority fighter used by G.I. Joe in the comics and animated series in the early 1980s, sold as a toy from 1983 to 1986. It closely resembles the real-life U.S. Navy F-14 Tomcat.
 Yak-12: a fictional Soviet jet aircraft featured in the film Jet Pilot starring John Wayne.  A Lockheed T-33 was used to portray the fictitious plane. The designation does, however, exist in the form of the Yakovlev Yak-12, a utility airplane from the Soviet Union.
 YSS-1000 Sabre: a fictional spaceplane being developed by the UNSC. It appears in Halo: Reach.

 Bombers and attackers 

A-164 Wipeout: a stealthy version of the A-10 Thunderbolt II used by NATO, from ARMA 3.
ADA-01A/01B ADLER: two attacker variants of the ADF-01 FALKEN fighter. As the first aircraft in the ADA series developed by Gründer Industries, it was designed to complement the FALKEN and defend it from surface-to-air attacks. It was also designed to test the experimental "SDBM" weapon. It was planned to appear in Ace Combat 5: The Unsung War, but the idea was scrapped. The B model, which replaces the SDBM from the ADA-01A with the MPBM (Multi-Purpose Burst Missile), appears in Ace Combat Infinity as a playable aircraft.
Banshee: a bomber made by the Brotherhood of Nod from reverse-engineered technology obtained through an extraterrestrial matrix called the Tacitus. It is outfitted with two rapid-fire plasma cannons, and appears in Command & Conquer: Tiberian Sun
B-19½: an enormous heavy bomber used by the pigs in propaganda cartoon Blitz Wolf to deploy the "Scream Bomb" on Adolf Wolf. It has at least 16 piston engines, and has 5 guns fitted to the bottom of the fuselage and a cannon fitted to the top.
B-6⅞: a tiny single-engined bomber used by the pigs to drop an incendiary bomb on Adolf Wolf, which lights his foot on fire. It is fitted with a lever to the right side of the cockpit, which lifts up the wings and deploys bombs.
 B-2X Century: a VTOL-equipped heavy bomber equipped with iron bombs, which could also deploy paratroopers. Used by the Allies in Command & Conquer: Red Alert 3 (2008).
 B-3: a fictional derivative of the B-2 Spirit featured in the 1996 film Broken Arrow and Command & Conquer: Generals – Zero Hour. B-39 Peacemaker: a fictional Cold War-era nuclear-powered USAF bomber in the Charles Stross novelette A Colder War. EB-52 Megafortress: The Megafortress first appears in Dale Brown's novel Flight of the Old Dog and is expanded upon and upgraded in his later books. The design contains a long SST nose, with a stealth shape and twin V-tails. Its eight engines are later replaced by four larger turbofans.
 EB-1C Vampire: first appearing in Dale Brown's novel Battle Born, the EB-1C is an advanced variant of the real-life B-1 Lancer. It differs from the real B-1 in that its wings are always swept all the way back, the tail is smaller and lacks the horizontal stabilizer, and it utilizes "Mission Adaptive Skin" that uses micro-hydraulics to affect the shape of its wings in-flight.
P-U "Stinka Bomber": a low-speed, shoddily built bomber used by Adolf Wolf in Blitz Wolf. It is detected by the pigs using their listening detector, and is promptly shot down by their huge, multi-cannon gun, simply named Secret Weapon. SuperCOIL: a secretly developed radar-invisible B-2 variant, which carries an airborne "COIL" chemical laser powerful enough to shoot down missiles in mid-flight, featured in the thriller novel SuperCOIL by Robert Ari.
 Vindicator: A fictitious supersonic bomber based on the Convair B-58 Hustler. In the 1964 film Fail Safe, the attack on Moscow is made by a squadron of Vindicators. While exterior shots of the plane relied on footage of B-58s, interior shots depicted a three-man crew similar to that of a conventional airliner and distinct from the tandem seating on a real B-58. The fictional Vindicator bomber was again represented by the B-58 Hustler in Fail Safe, a 2000 made-for-TV remake starring George Clooney.
 Valkyrie: Appears in the 1985 video game Rescue on Fractalus!. A variant of the (also fictional) F-27 Firedrake, the Valkyrie is a bomber and attack aircraft capable of line-of-sight dogfighting using an antimatter bubble torpedo projector and defended by "Dirac Mirror Shields", which can redirect any form of energy attack and some physical attacks. The Valkyrie is a primarily air-breathing/aerodynamic-lift aircraft, but is capable of exoatmospheric flight and operations from space-based carrier ships. It is a single-seat aircraft, but the Valkyrie variant, named after the choosers of the slain from Norse mythology, has been modified for search and rescue and can transport up to 20 recovered personnel in a separate section of the aircraft.

 Gunships 

 AT-99 Scorpion: a VTOL gunship which uses two transverse ducted rotors for lift. It has a crew of one. The aircraft appears in the 2009 film Avatar.
Cordium-powered airships from Project Wingman:'Anura-class air cruiser: The smallest type of airship for civilian and military use. Equipped with standard anti-aircraft armament.Arcion-class air heavy cruiser: Similar to the Anura, but equipped with railguns and more advanced weaponry.Littoria-class air battlecruiser: Larger airship used by both civilian and military forces. More advanced variants can be equipped with railguns.205-class air battleship: The largest known class of airship. Bristling with CIWS turrets, railguns, and SAM batteries. Civilian and military use known.
 C-21 Dragon: a VTOL four-post ducted-fan transport and gunship, which appears in the film Avatar.
 SA-2 Samson: a ducted-fan transverse rotor utility assault transport from the film Avatar.
 XH9 Warbird: a VTOL ducted-fan twin-rotor utility aircraft that is used by the United States Air Force and the Atlas Corporation. It is equipped with machine guns, rockets, and a cloaking device. It appears in Call of Duty: Advanced Warfare.
 Orca: a family of VTOL gunships used by the Global Defense Initiative (GDI) from the Command & Conquer video game series.

 Unmanned aerial vehicles EDI: Featured in the film Stealth, the Extreme Deep Invader (EDI) was developed as an assistant to the FA-37 Talon. The craft has an artificial intelligence system that allows it to operate without a human pilot. The sensors can identify a human target by fingerprints, voice identification, or facial recognition. It has V/STOL capabilities and pulse detonation scramjet engines fueled by catalyzed A1 methane.MQ-99: A UCAV developed by Gründer Industries and used by Erusea to intercept enemy aircraft that cross the boundary lines of a "drone interceptor network". MQ-99s will launch if any pilot in the area does not identify themselves as friendly after a certain amount of time, and are also capable of being launched from shipping containers. From Ace Combat 7: Skies Unknown (2019).MQ-101: A UCAV used by Erusea that resembles the Northrop Grumman X-47B. It is carried by the Arsenal Bird airborne aircraft carrier, which deploys them to defend itself from enemy aircraft. From Ace Combat 7: Skies Unknown (2019).UCAV Wyvern: A UCAV seen in the game War Thunder that was featured in the 2021 April Fools event. The Wyvern featured anti-air missiles, cruise missiles, and anti-ground missiles. The Wyvern has significantly superior metals and alloys that allowed it to achieve extremely high wing overload rates compared to planes that are regularly seen in the game. The Wyvern was removed from the game on the 5th of April 2021 when the April Fools event concluded.

Special operations

 Aerowing: an aircraft that the story says was built by villain Lex Luthor. It has two fuselages, six engines and undernose guns, and was flown from the mid-Atlantic Ocean to the Amazon rainforest in the DC Comics book Elseworld's Finest #2.
 Airwolf: an attack helicopter from the 1984 TV series of the same name. It was capable of supersonic flight and carried retractable weapons. The helicopter used was a modified Bell 222.
 Albatross: appears in Gerry Anderson’s New Captain Scarlet.
 AmphibiCopter: a 21st century submersible two-seater aircraft which appeared in the 2001 film A.I. Artificial Intelligence.
 Arkbird: a long-range low-orbiting lifting body spacecraft conceived by the nation of Osea. Its laser cannon was originally meant to neutralize space debris, but was repurposed to shoot down ground targets and ordnance alike. Further tampering with the design gave it the ability to deploy UCAVs and ballistic cannons for self-defense. From Ace Combat 5: The Unsung War (2005).
 Batcopter: a modified Bell 47G-3 which made an appearance in the 1966 Batman film.
 Batwing: This iconic aircraft was used in the 1989 Batman film starring Michael Keaton.
 Blue Thunder: a fictional police helicopter from the film and television series of the same name. The aircraft incorporated an optically tracked rotary gun, a "whisper mode" for quiet flight, surveillance equipment, and an infrared camera. The helicopter used in the film was a modified Aérospatiale Gazelle.
 Bubble ship: an aircraft that resembles a dragonfly combined with the canopy of a Bell 47 helicopter. The machine features rotating VTOL engines and a cockpit that swivels along with the upper and lower guns fixed to it. The craft was flown by Tom Cruise’s character Jack Harper in the sci-fi film Oblivion.
 BV-38 Flying Wing: a bent-winged twin-prop transport, which appeared in the 1981 film Raiders of the Lost Ark.
 D79-TC Pelican: An extremely versatile dropship used by the UNSC, mainly for the transportation of personnel, vehicles and equipment. Occasionally used as a support gunship in the Halo video game franchise
 Cobra F.A.N.G.: a short range one-man light-attack gyrocopter, equipped with air-to-air heat-seeking rockets. This craft appeared in the comics and the first season of the G.I. Joe animated series, as well in the 1985 computer game.
 Condor/Vulture: A main element of the first chapter of Wolfenstein: The New Order and appearing in Wolfenstein: The Old Blood, the Condor is the supposed result of the modification of an Avro Lancaster using American-built parts. It is equipped with four quad autocannon turrets, with one mounted above the protruding cockpit, two mounted at the top and bottom of the tail end, and one turret chin-mounted below the cockpit. The autocannons appear to fire HVAP rounds exclusively, as enemy aircraft can take multiple hits without catching fire, while armored ground units are affected much more by these rounds. Although the official name for this type of aircraft is "Condor", the call sign for troop transport variants is Vulture, with the "Condor" call sign only being used to refer to the troop support variants.  
 F-117X Remora: an experimental F-117 variant used in the film Executive Decision. It is modified to transport personnel with an in-flight docking probe designed to dock with other aircraft in midair. Originally designed to relieve fatigued bomber crews at altitude, this aircraft was used to transport a special operations unit to a commercial airliner which had been hijacked by terrorists.
 Flying Sub FS-1: Introduced in the Voyage to the Bottom of the Sea TV series, this hybrid submersible is capable of flight, as well as conducting underwater operations. The design resembles that of a stingray, with twin tail fins on the back, and has room for a crew of two.
 Ornithopter: a flapping-wing craft featured in the novel Dune by Frank Herbert and in the 1984 film of the same name.
 Snowspeeder: a military variant of the T-47 airspeeder, adapted for cold climates. The craft appeared in the 1980 film The Empire Strikes Back.
 Invisible Plane: from the Wonder Woman comic books and TV series.
 Quinjet: a craft featured in the Avengers comic books and films. It is a multirole jet aircraft used by S.H.I.E.L.D, with VTOL capabilities and a tilted cockpit to provide pilots with better visibility during landings.
 Spider's Wing: a flying wing aircraft used by the leader of the Spider Gang to terrorize citizens in the Dick Tracy comics.
 Tiltrotor craft: a stealth VTOL tiltrotor vehicle used by the antagonists in the sci-fi film Resident Evil: Afterlife. The craft has similarities to the real life V-22 Osprey.
 Thunderbird 2: from Gerry Anderson's Thunderbirds. It is a bulbous VTOL cargo carrier that comes equipped with a variety of service modules.
 UH-144 Falcon: a tiltrotor troop transport used by the UNSC in the Halo franchise.
It was purportedly able to carry and deploy up to 50 fighter planes.
 X-Jet Blackbird: featured in the X-Men films, it is a modified SR-71 Blackbird with forward-swept wings and VTOL capabilities. The craft has room for a dozen personnel.
 YF-12A X-Jet Prototype: the predecessor to the X-Jet and the SR-71, the aircraft was designed and flown by Hank McCoy. The prototype incorporates VTOL capabilities and an internal cargo hold for personnel. The plane appeared in the 2011 film X-Men: First Class.

 Airborne aircraft carriers 

 Argo: a flying wing operated by Monarch that deploys and recovers V-22 Ospreys in Godzilla: King of the Monsters.
 Arsenal Bird: a large unmanned aircraft carrier designed to hold up to 80 MQ-101 UCAVs, featured in Ace Combat 7: Skies Unknown. It is a flying wing powered by numerous contra-rotating propeller engines and armed with three laser defense systems, air-to-air missile launchers, and a force field referred to as the Active Protection System (APS). Originally built by Osea to protect the International Space Elevator, the two Arsenal Birds in operation were later hijacked by Erusea before the events of the game. It also deploys beyond-visual-range "Helios" airburst missiles.
 AAC-03 Banshee III: a massive airborne aircraft carrier that is used as a base of operations. Two Banshees, the other being designated the AAC-04 Banshee IV, were built to allow the Fairy Air Force to coordinate their operations anywhere over the surface of the continent. It appears in both the Yukikaze anime and novel adaptations.
 Cloudbase: Captain Scarlet and the MysteronsDaedalus: a flying aircraft carrier used by the STAG (Special Tactical Anti-Gang) unit in Saints Row: The Third.
 Helicarrier: a series of massive carriers in Marvel comics that resemble conventional seaborne aircraft carriers and also serve as capital ships.
 Iron Vulture: an airship captained by the air pirate leader Don Karnage in the Disney animated series TaleSpin.
 P-1112 Aigaion: An airborne closed flying wing carrier armed with airburst cruise missiles (delegating terminal guidance to UAVs for long-range strikes) similar to the Helios missiles used by the Arsenal Bird. It also serves as a base for the infamous Estovakian elite squadron "Strigon Team". Originally featured in Ace Combat 6: Fires of Liberation (2007).
 Pandora: an airship used by Nathan Zachary and his air pirate gang the Fortune Hunters in the Crimson Skies game franchise.
 Royal Navy flying aircraft carriers: Appear in Sky Captain and the World of Tomorrow.
 Skybase: Appears in Gerry Anderson's New Captain Scarlet.
 Valiant: a flying command ship/aircraft carrier used by UNIT in Doctor Who

Civilian

 Commercial 

 Antonov 500: a heavy transport that appears in the film 2012, based on the Antonov An-225.
 Carreidas 160: a prototype supersonic business jet with 10 seats, seen in Flight 714 to Sydney, one of The Adventures of Tintin.
 Elgin E-474: featured in the 2005 film Flightplan, based on the Airbus A380.
 Fireflash: a hypersonic transport featured in Gerry Anderson's Thunderbirds TV series.
 Fortress-1 and Fortress-2: a successive pair of massive Helicarrier-like vehicles employed by the fictional Cyberbiotics Corporation in the Disney animated series Gargoyles, commissioned by the firm's founder, the disabled CEO Halcyon Renard. 
 Hindenburg III: an upgraded dirigible featured in the film Sky Captain and the World of Tomorrow.
 Jeremy the Jet Plane: an anthropomorphic jet airliner who lives in the Sodor Airport. He is based on the BAC One-Eleven and is featured in the Thomas & Friends TV series.
 Norton N-22: a wide-body passenger aircraft at the center of a safety investigation in Michael Crichton's novel Airframe.
 Orion III: a space plane featured in the 1968 sci-fi film 2001: A Space Odyssey, used to shuttle personnel from Earth to the orbiting space station. It wore a Pan Am livery. 
 Rutland Reindeer: Appeared in No Highway in the Sky, a film based loosely on Neville Shute's No Highway. The aircraft used was a modified Handley Page Halifax.
 Skyfleet S570: a prototype airplane that appeared in the 2006 film Casino Royale, which was actually a Boeing 747-200 originally owned by British Airways. It was refitted with two mock-up engines on each inner pylon and external fuel tanks on the outer pylons, somewhat anachronistically resembling a B-52 Stratofortress.
 Spectrum Passenger Jet: a twin-turbojet personnel transport, from Captain Scarlet and the Mysterons. 
 Starflight: a hypersonic transport which was featured in the 1983 TV movie Starflight: The Plane That Couldn't Land.
 Rocket plane: a Concorde-like rocket-powered plane used by the Nazi Empire in The Man in the High Castle novel and TV series.
 Luxemburg (LZ131): a dirigible based on a Zeppelin design, which appeared in the climatic ending of the 1991 film The Rocketeer.

Personal
 Albatross: a 19th-century large propeller-powered airship in the novel Robur the Conqueror, aka Clipper of the Clouds by Jules Verne, and in the film version of Verne's Master of the World.
 Conwing L-16: an amphibious seaplane based on the Fairchild C-119 Flying Boxcar, featured in the animated Disney series TaleSpin, an example of which is the Sea Duck flown by bush pilot Baloo.
 Drake Bullet: an air racer flown by Clark Gable’s character in the 1938 film Test Pilot. A Seversky P-35 was used to fulfill the aircraft's role.
 Harold the Helicopter: a cartoon helicopter based on the Sikorsky H-19, featured in the Thomas & Friends TV series.
 Möwe, a jet-powered motor glider–like craft used by the titular character in Nausicaä of the Valley of the Wind. The craft was brought from fiction to reality by fans of the film under the name OpenSky.
 T-16 Skyhopper: Luke Skywalker's canyon flyer on the planet Tatooine, which appeared in Star Wars: A New Hope
 The Terror': a 19th-century land, sea and air craft invented by Robur the Conqueror, featured in Jules Verne's The Master of the World.''

See also
 Aircraft in fiction
 Airborne aircraft carrier
 List of fictional spacecraft

References

 
Aircraft
Fictional